The fixture list for the 2018 season was issued on 15 November 2018.  The regular season comprised 26 rounds where each team played each other home and away.

All times are UK local time (UTC or UTC+1) on the relevant dates.

Round 1

Round 2

All games in the division were postponed on 4 March due to ice and snow.

Round 3

Round 4

Round 5

Round 6

Round 7

Round 8

Round 9

Round 10

Round 11

Round 12

Round 13

Round 14

Round 15

Round 16

Round 17

Round 18

Round 19

Round 20

Round 21

Round 22

Round 23

Round 24

Round 25

Round 26

Play-off semi-finals

Promotion Final

Promotion play-off final

References

2018 in English rugby league
RFL League 1 results
RFL League 1